Nikolay Kirillovich Kokorin (21 May 1889 – 16 May 1917), was one of the most successful Russian flying aces and fighter pilots during World War I, credited with five aerial victories.

Biography

Early life 
Nikolai Kirillovich Kokorin was born into a working-class family in Khlebnikovo (near Moscow) on 21 May 1889. He received primary education in a small Russian Orthodox school before beginning work as a laborer. Though he was energetic and hardworking, he felt his limited education offered him no chance for advancing himself in life working in a factory.

Kokorin joined the Russian military on 23 December 1910, serving first with the Vislyanskaya Mine battalion. He applied for a transfer to the newly formed Siberian Aeronautics Battalion for pilot's training in June 1912 and was assigned to its motor pool. He did not begin pilot's training until 21 January 1914. On 20 September 1914, Kokorin qualified as a pilot on a Nieuport and was promoted to Starshyi Unter-Officer (a senior noncommissioned rank).

Involvement in World War I 

Kokorin was forwarded to the 4th Corps Fighter Detachment in December 1914. After gaining flying experience with them, he was sent to the Moscow Aviation School for advanced training on 19 July 1915. He returned to his unit on 4 September. He also flew daring reconnaissance and bombing missions with such brio that he had earned all four classes of the Cross of Saint George by December 1915. Kokorin was engaged in aerial combat on several occasions while flying reconnaissance and bombing missions but failed to score any victories. He was aggressive enough that in his first combat, on 14 April 1916, it was noted that he and his observer attacked and drove off a German Albatros with pistol fire, though return machine gun fire wounded Kokorin's observer.

On 25 August 1916, Kokorin was raised to Praporshik by order of his commander-in-chief. Also in August 1916, his unit was moved to Luzk, where he flew the SPAD VII and later the Nieuport 11. He served under command of Alexander Kazakov while they flew defensive sorties during the Siege of Ternopol.

Kokorin scored his first win on 25 November 1916. He would not succeed again until 2 January 1917. His third victory did not come until 14 April 1917. Kokorin went on leave on 20 April 1917. He scored his fourth victory the day after he returned to duty. He became an ace the day after that, 26 May. On 29 May 1917, Nikolai Kokorin took on three enemy airplanes at 0600 hours. He took a bullet through his chest from shoulder to shoulder. His remains and his aircraft fell to the east of Pidhaitsi (present day Ukraine).

On 22 July 1917, Kokorin was promoted to Podporuchik.

List of aerial victories

See also Aerial victory standards of World War I, List of World War I flying aces from the Russian Empire

Confirmed victories are numbered and listed chronologically.

Honors and awards 

 Cross of Saint George All four classes: By December 1915
 Gold Sword for Bravery: 31 July 1917 (posthumously)
 Order of Saint George Fourth Class:  31 July 1917 (posthumously)
 Order of Saint Anna Fourth Class for Bravery: 26 January 1917
 Order of Saint Stanilas Third Class with Crossed Swords and Bow: 13 April 1917

Endnotes

References 

 Allen Durkota: Thomas Darcey; Victor Kulikov. The Imperial Russian Air Service: Famous Pilots and Aircraft and World War I. Flying Machines Press, 1995. , 9780963711021.
 Norman Franks; Russell Guest; Gregory Alegi. Above the War Fronts: The British Two-seater Bomber Pilot and Observer Aces, the British Two-seater Fighter Observer Aces, and the Belgian, Italian, Austro-Hungarian and Russian Fighter Aces, 1914–1918: Volume 4 of Fighting Airmen of WWI Series: Volume 4 of Air Aces of WWI. Grub Street, 1997. , .
 Victor Kulikov. Russian Aces of World War 1: Aircraft of the Aces. Osprey Publishing, 2013. , 9781780960616.

External links 
 Full biography of Nikolay Kokorin 

1889 births
1917 deaths
Russian aviators
Aerial warfare pioneers
Aviators killed in aviation accidents or incidents
Russian military personnel killed in World War I
Russian World War I flying aces
Imperial Russian Air Force personnel
Recipients of the Gold Sword for Bravery
Recipients of the Cross of St. George
Recipients of the Order of St. Anna, 4th class